The Li Keqiang Government was the Central People's Government of China from 15 March 2013, when Premier Li Keqiang took office, until March 2023. It succeeded the Wen Jiabao government. Premier Li is ranked only second to Party general secretary Xi Jinping among 7 members of the 18th and 19th Politburo Standing Committee, top decision-making body of the Chinese Communist Party (CCP).

During the 1st Session of the 12th National People's Congress in March 2013, Li Keqiang was appointed by new President Xi Jinping to replace Wen Jiabao as Premier of the State Council, China's head of government, according to the approval of the National People's Congress. During the 1st Session of the 13th National People's Congress in March 2018, Li Keqiang was appointed by President Xi according to the approval of the National People's Congress to re-serve as the Premier.

According to the Constitution of the People's Republic of China, the President nominates the Premier of the State Council, and the Premier nominates the Vice-Premiers, State Councilors and Ministers. The nominations were approved by National People's Congress voting.

Cabinet I (12th State Council)

Cabinet II (13th State Council)

State Council leaders

Cabinet-level departments

Other ministry-level and sub-ministry-level agencies

Special organization directly under the State Council 
 Ministry-level

Organizations directly under the State Council 
 Ministry-level

 Sub-ministry-level

Administrative Offices under the State Council 
 Ministry-level

Institutions directly under the State Council 
 Ministry-level

 Sub-ministry-level

National Administrations administered by ministry-level agencies 
 Sub-ministry-level

Interdepartmental coordinating agencies 
 National Defense Mobilization Commission (NDMC)
 Financial Stability and Development Committee (FSDC), established in 2017
and many more...

Agencies dispatched by the State Council 
 Ministry-level
 Liaison Office of the Central People's Government in the Hong Kong Special Administrative Region, established on 18 January 2000.
 Liaison Office of the Central People's Government in the Macao Special Administrative Region, established on 18 January 2000.

 Sub-ministry-level
 Office for Safeguarding National Security of the Central People's Government in the Hong Kong Special Administrative Region, established on 1 July 2020.

See also 

 Generations of Chinese leadership
 Hu–Wen Administration (2002–2012)
 Xi–Li Administration (2012–2017)
 Xi Jinping Core Administration (2017–present)

Notes

References 

Li Keqiang
Government of China
State Council of the People's Republic of China
2013 establishments in China
Current governments
Cabinets established in 2013